The 2016 Pakistan Hockey League season, abbreviated to PHL 2016, is the first season of the Pakistan Hockey League.  Six teams will be participating.

Rules and regulations 
Six teams took part in the tournament and each team played two matches against each team, one at their home venue and one at the venue of the opposition team.

The points in the league phase of the tournament were awarded as follows:

If at the end of the League two or more teams had the same number of points for any place, these teams would be ranked according to the following order:
respective number of matches won;
respective goal difference (goals for less goals against). A positive goal difference always takes precedence over a negative one;
respective number of goals scored;
the cumulative results of the two matches played between those two teams taking firstly the points won in the two matches, secondly the goal difference, and thirdly the number of goals scored

Teams 
Six teams participates in debut edition of Pakistan Hockey League, which will represents following cities/states, Lahore, Karachi, Kashmir, Peshawar, Quetta & Islamabad. Divulging details he said that there would be six teams of every province and each of these would have five foreign players. “We’re optimistic to get attention of a reasonable number of international players,” he said adding that the owners of the franchises would themselves decide the names of their teams.

Venues 

The inaugural edition of Pakistan Hockey League will be held in three different cities of Pakistan. Faisalabad, Gojra and Lahore will be host this event. The league matches will be played in Faisalabad Hockey Stadium from Faisalabad, Gojra Hockey Stadium from Gojra and the National Hockey Stadium, Lahore. The final of this tournament will also be held in National Hockey Stadium, Lahore.

PHF Secretary Shahbaz Senior revealed that the PHF is expecting a lot of international players for the league and added that while the federation is doing its best to host the league in Pakistan.

Broadcasting 
Pakistan Hockey Federation said that they were in talks were also in progress for the official broadcasters of the league. The following Pakistani channels will be broadcasting of this league. The foreign channels who will be broadcast this league very soon announced.

See also 
Field hockey
International field hockey tournaments
Pakistan men's national field hockey team

References

External links 
 

2016
2016 in field hockey